Boiling Spring Lakes is a city in Brunswick County, North Carolina, United States. The population was 5,943 at the 2020 census, up from 5,372 in 2010.

History
Boiling Spring Lakes was incorporated as a town in 1961.

In 2018 Hurricane Florence damaged roads in Boiling Spring Lakes and destroyed four dams. FEMA money has been used to repair these.

Geography
Boiling Spring Lakes is located at  (34.038495, -78.053898). North Carolina Highway 87 passes north–south through the center of the community.

Demographics

2020 census

As of the 2020 United States census, there were 5,943 people, 2,274 households, and 1,642 families residing in the city.

2000 census
As of the census of 2000, there were 2,972 people, 1,208 households, and 941 families residing in the city. The population density was 131.5 people per square mile (50.8/km2). There were 1,409 housing units at an average density of 62.3 per square mile (24.1/km2). The racial makeup of the city was 94.55% White, 3.26% African American, 0.67% Native American, 0.34% Asian, 0.10% from other races, and 1.08% from two or more races. Hispanic or Latino of any race were 0.61% of the population.

There were 1,208 households, out of which 28.7% had children under the age of 18 living with them, 64.6% were married couples living together, 9.1% had a female householder with no husband present, and 22.1% were non-families. 17.5% of all households were made up of individuals, and 7.2% had someone living alone who was 65 years of age or older. The average household size was 2.46 and the average family size was 2.73.

In the city, the population was spread out, with 22.0% under the age of 18, 6.0% from 18 to 24, 29.2% from 25 to 44, 27.4% from 45 to 64, and 15.3% who were 65 years of age or older. The median age was 40 years. For every 100 females, there were 96.2 males. For every 100 females age 18 and over, there were 97.4 males.

The median income for a household in the city was $37,165, and the median income for a family was $40,810. Males had a median income of $31,992 versus $21,667 for females. The per capita income for the city was $18,079. About 8.1% of families and 9.5% of the population were below the poverty line, including 11.8% of those under age 18 and 7.6% of those age 65 or over.

References

External links
 City of Boiling Springs Lakes official website
 Boiling Spring Lakes, NC City Guide

Cities in North Carolina
Cities in Brunswick County, North Carolina
Cape Fear (region)